Doug Lee may refer to:

Doug Lee (basketball) (born 1964), retired American professional basketball player
Doug Lee (musician) in Mekong Delta (band)

See also
Doug Lea, professor of computer science
Douglas Lee (disambiguation)